Sandra Schmitt (April 26, 1981 – November 11, 2000) was a German freestyle skier. In 1998, she came 9th in the Women's Moguls contest at the 1998 Winter Olympics in Nagano. She became the Women's Dual Moguls World Champion in 1999. Schmitt died with her parents in the Kaprun disaster on 11 November 2000.

References

External links 
 International Ski Federation profile
 Sports-reference.com Olympics profile

1981 births
2000 deaths
People from Groß-Gerau (district)
Sportspeople from Darmstadt (region)
Freestyle skiers at the 1998 Winter Olympics
German female freestyle skiers
Railway accident deaths in Austria
Deaths from fire
20th-century German women